The Maine Celtics are an American professional basketball team in the NBA G League based in Portland, Maine, and are affiliated with the Boston Celtics. The Maine Celtics play their home games at the Portland Expo Building. The team debuted in the 2009–10 season as the Maine Red Claws and have since won three division titles. The Boston Celtics purchased the franchise in July 2019 from Maine Basketball, LLC, a company chaired by William Ryan, Jr., and renamed the team the Maine Celtics in 2021.

Franchise history

On February 25, 2009, the NBA Development League (D-League) awarded the city of Portland, Maine, with an expansion franchise. On July 21, 2009, the Red Claws announced Austin Ainge as the first head coach of the team. On April 2, 2009, "Red Claws" was announced as the winning name after a name-the-team contest, beating out Beacons, Crushers, Destroyers, Swarm, and Traps. The name and logo gave homage to the lobster fishing industry, a major economic engine of the New England area. The use of "Red" in the team's name also served to pay tribute to longtime Boston Celtics coach Red Auerbach. During the 2009–10 season, the Red Claws were the only D-League team to sell out all 24 of their home games. This streak continued until the 2011–12 season, ending the streak at 48 consecutive games.

On June 21, 2012, the Red Claws announced that they had entered a hybrid affiliation with the Boston Celtics, making the Celtics the Red Claws' sole affiliate. For the team's first two seasons, their affiliation was split between the Celtics and the Charlotte Bobcats. For its third season, the team's affiliation was split between Boston, Charlotte and the Philadelphia 76ers.

The Red Claws made their first playoff appearance in April 2013, entering the playoffs as the eighth seeded team and being swept by the Rio Grande Valley Vipers in a best-of-three-game opening round series.

On July 16, 2014, the Red Claws announced that Mike Taylor would not return for a third season as the team's head coach. He had a 45–55 record as coach over two seasons with the team. He was replaced by Canadian Scott Morrison after 11 seasons as the head coach of Lakehead University's Lakehead Thunderwolves. Morrison spent the 2013–14 season as a D-League assistant. On June 21, 2017, Brad Stevens, Boston Celtics head coach, named him as an assistant coach with the Celtics. In 2017, the D-League rebranded as the NBA G League via a sponsorship with Gatorade.

On July 25, 2019, the Celtics announced they would purchase the Red Claws franchise from original owners Bill Ryan and Bill Ryan, Jr. Before the sale, the Red Claws had been one of the few remaining independently owned G League franchises. Their sale to the Celtics continued the trend of NBA teams purchasing their G League affiliates. The sale was finalized on October 15, 2019.

On December 7, 2019, Bryce Brown set a franchise record with scoring 11 of 11 three-pointers for the Red Claws in a 128–123 loss to the Delaware Blue Coats. The 2019–20 season was then curtailed in March 2020 by the onset of the COVID-19 pandemic while the Red Claws were in first place in their division. The following 2020–21 season was then delayed due to the ongoing pandemic-related restrictions and eventually held at a single location in Orlando, Florida. However, the Celtics decided to not have the Red Claws participate and opted out of the season.

On May 24, 2021, the Boston Celtics announced the Red Claws had been rebranded the Maine Celtics beginning with the 2021–22 season.

Season-by-season

Head coaches

Current roster

Players assigned from NBA teams
 Bill Walker – assigned by the Boston Celtics on November 21, 2009
 Alexis Ajinca – assigned by the Charlotte Bobcats on November 30, 2009
 Lester Hudson – assigned by the Boston Celtics on December 15 and December 26, 2009
 Sherron Collins – assigned by the Charlotte Bobcats on December 8, 2010
 Avery Bradley – assigned by the Boston Celtics on January 14, 2011
 Craig Brackins – assigned by the Philadelphia 76ers on February 7, 2012
 Fab Melo – assigned by the Boston Celtics on November 14, 2012
 Kris Joseph – assigned by the Boston Celtics on November 14, 2012
 MarShon Brooks - assigned by the Boston Celtics on January 1, 2014
 Rajon Rondo – assigned by the Boston Celtics on January 15, 2014
 Vítor Faverani - assigned by the Boston Celtics on January 25, 2014
 Vander Blue - assigned by the Boston Celtics on January 31, 2014
 Jordan Mickey - assigned by the Boston Celtics on November 5, 2015
 Terry Rozier - assigned by the Boston Celtics on November 5, 2015

Players recalled by NBA teams
 Lester Hudson – recalled by the Boston Celtics on December 20, 2009
 Bill Walker – recalled by the Boston Celtics on December 23, 2009
 Alexis Ajinça – recalled by the Charlotte Bobcats on February 2, 2010
 Sherron Collins – recalled by the Charlotte Bobcats on December 21, 2010
 Avery Bradley – recalled by the Boston Celtics on February 7, 2011
 Craig Brackins – recalled by the Philadelphia 76ers on March 2, 2012
 Rajon Rondo – recalled by the Boston Celtics on January 15, 2014
 Jordan Mickey - recalled by the Boston Celtics on January 16, 2016
 Kadeem Allen - recalled by the Boston Celtics on January 29, 2018

NBA affiliates
 Boston Celtics (2009–present)
 Charlotte Bobcats (2009–2012)
 Philadelphia 76ers (2011–2012)

References

External links
 

Maine Celtics
Basketball teams established in 2009
Basketball teams in Maine
2009 establishments in Maine